A mule is the offspring of a female horse and a male donkey.

Mule, Mules, MULE or The Mule can also refer to:

Animals
 Mule (sheep), in British sheep farming, a cross between a meat ram and a hardy mountain ewe
 Mule deer (Odocoileus hemionus), a North American species of deer (not a hybrid) with large mule-like ears
 Mules, hybrid British finches, such as of a goldfinch and a canary

Arts, entertainment, and media

Fictional entities
 Mule (Foundation), a character in Isaac Asimov's Foundation Series

Films
 Francis the Talking Mule a 1954 film, launching a series of seven films featuring the character.
 The Mule, also known as Border Run, a 2012 film starring Sharon Stone
 The Mule (2014 film), a 2014 Australian film starring Hugo Weaving, Angus Sampson, and John Noble
 The Mule (2018 film), a 2018 American film starring and directed by Clint Eastwood

Music
 Mule (album), a 1990 album by Alice Donut
 Mule (band), an American punk blues band fronted by P.  Long
 "Mule", a song by Agoraphobic Nosebleed from the 7" single Agoraphobic Nosebleed
 "Mule", a song by Gov't Mule from the album Gov't Mule
 "The Mule" (song), a song by Deep Purple from the album Fireball
 "The Mule", a song by The Magic Numbers from the album The Magic Numbers

Other uses in arts, entertainment, and media
 Mule (newspaper), a non-profit, Manchester-based independent media project
 M.U.L.E., a 1983 multiplayer video game
 The Mule (dance), a 1960s dance fad
 "The Mule", a Hugo Award-winning novella republished as the second half of the novel Foundation and Empire

People
 Mule (nickname), a list of people
 Mule (surname), a list of people with the last name Mule or Mules

Places
 Mule, Norway, a village in Levanger municipality in Trøndelag county, Norway
 Mule Island, Princess Elizabeth Land, Antarctica
 Mule Keys, a group of scattered islets in the Florida Keys
 Mule Key, easternmost of the islets
 Mule Lake, a lake in Minnesota
 Mule Mountains (California), Riverside County, California
 Mule Mountains, Cochise County, Arizona
 Mule Peninsula, Princess Elizabeth Land, Antarctica
 Mule Point, Kemp Land, Antarctica
 Mule Town, Ohio, an unincorporated community
 The Mule (river), a river in Wales

Software
 Mule (software), an open source Java-based Enterprise Service Bus
 MULE, the MUltiLingual Extension to Emacs allowing editing text written in multiple languages

Sports teams
 Mules, the sports teams of Leilehua High School, Wahiawa, Hawaii 
 Mules, the sports teams of Muleshoe High School, Muleshoe, Texas
 Mules, the sports teams of Muhlenberg College, Allentown, Pennsylvania
 Central Missouri Mules and Jennies, the sports teams of the University of Central Missouri
 Colby Mules, the sports teams of Colby College, in Waterville, Maine
 New Britain Mules, a 1930s American Basketball League team
 Newark Bears (basketball), an American Basketball League team renamed the Newark Mules for the 1934 season; merged with the New Britain Jackaways to form the New Britain Mules in the second half of the season
 St. Louis Mules, a member of the American Soccer League in the 1972 season

Transport
 Mule, the NATO reporting name of the Polikarpov Po-2 Soviet biplane
 Mule, a type of locomotive
 Mule, a light utility vehicle produced by Kawasaki and by extension any similar vehicle
 Mule, the U.S. Military M274 Truck, Platform, Utility 1/2 Ton, 4X4, a 4-wheel drive military vehicle
 Mules (Amtrak), two passenger trains which ran between St. Louis and Kansas City, Missouri
 Development mule (typically simply "mule"), a vehicle equipped with experimental or prototype components for testing
 Maultier ("Mule"), a series of German World War II half-tracks
 Multifunctional Utility/Logistics and Equipment vehicle (MULE), an unmanned six-wheeled vehicle

Other uses
 Mule (cocktail), a cocktail made of a spirit, ginger beer and lime juice
 Mule (coin), a coin or medal minted with obverse and reverse designs not normally seen on the same piece
 Mule (shoe), a type of shoe or slipper without a back
 Mule (smuggling), a smuggler of contraband
 Spinning mule or Crompton's mule, a textile spinning technology created by Samuel Crompton in 1779

See also
 eMule, a peer-to-peer file sharing application for Microsoft Windows
 Mul (disambiguation)
 Mulesing, a controversial Australian procedure which aims to reduce fly-strike in sheep by removing folds of skin around the tail